Lathrop may refer to:

Places

Lathrop, California, city in San Joaquin County, California, United States
Lathrop, Michigan, an unincorporated community
Lathrop, Missouri, city in Clinton County, Missouri, United States
Lathrop Township, Pennsylvania, Susquehanna County, Pennsylvania, United States

People

Austin E. Lathrop (1865–1950), American industrialist
Barbour Lathrop (1847–1927), American philanthropist
Clarissa Caldwell Lathrop (1847–1892), American social reformer, autobiographer
Cyrus L. Lathrop (1862–1941), American politician
Dorothy P. Lathrop (1891–1980), American author and illustrator
Francis Lathrop (1849–1909), American artist
George Parsons Lathrop (1851–1898), American poet and novelist
Gertrude K. Lathrop (1896–1996), American sculptor
Henry A. Lathrop (1848–1911), American physician and politician
Ida Pulis Lathrop (1859–1937), American painter
John Lathrop (judge) (1835–1910), an Associate Justice of the Supreme Judicial Court of Massachusetts
Jack Lathrop (1913–1987), jazz guitarist and vocalist
Jedediah Hyde Lathrop (1806–1889), American merchant and government official
John Lathrop  (disambiguation), multiple people
John Hiram Lathrop (1799–1866), first president of both the University of Missouri and the University of Wisconsin as well as 
Julia Lathrop (1858–1932), American social reformer
Philip H. Lathrop (1912–1995), American cinematographer
Rose Hawthorne Lathrop (1851–1926), American Roman Catholic nun and social worker
Steve Lathrop (born 1957), American politician
William Langson Lathrop (1859–1938), American landscape painter 
The Lathrop sisters  (Clara, Bessie, and Susanne), American artists and educators from Massachusetts
Lathrop Burgess, American politician

Other

Lathrop High School (Alaska), public high school in Fairbanks, Alaska, United States
Lathrop High School (California), public secondary school in Lathrop, California